Montenegro competed at the 2018 Mediterranean Games in Tarragona, Spain from 22 June to 1 July 2018.

Medals

Karate 

Marina Raković won one of the bronze medals in the women's kumite 68 kg event.

References 

Nations at the 2018 Mediterranean Games
2018
2018 in Montenegrin sport